Chafe may refer to:
Chafé, village in Portugal 
Chafe, Nigeria, a Local Government Area in Zamfara State 
Chafe (crater), Martian crater named after Chafe, Nigeria

People 
Chris Chafe (born 1952), Swiss musician and scientist
Eric Chafe (born 1946), American musicologist
Paul Chafe (born 1965), author
Rick Chafe, Canadian playwright
Robert Chafe (born 1971), Canadian playwright and actor
 Thomas Chafe (Totnes MP) (c. 1611–1662), MP for Totnes, 1660
 Thomas Chafe (Bridport MP) (c. 1642–1701), his son, MP for Bridport, 1685–1688
Wallace Chafe (1927–2019), American linguist
William Chafe (born 1942), American historian

See also
Friction burn